Parliamentary elections were held in Armenia between 21 and 23 June 1919. The electoral system used was party-list proportional representation using the D'Hondt method in one national district. The result was a landslide victory for the Armenian Revolutionary Federation (ARF) which won 72 of the 80 seats. However the election was boycotted by the Hunchaks and Populists. Voter turnout was 71.2%. The first republic ended when the country taken over by the Soviet Union the following year and multi-party elections were not held again until 1995.

The ARF originally won 73 seats, but one seat was apparently assigned later to the Muslim faction, reducing the party's seat total to 72.

Results

Initial membership
The elected deputies of the parliament were:

References

Armenia
Armenia
Parliamentary elections in Armenia
Parliamentary